The University of Science and Technology of Togo is a private university in West Africa whose headquarters are in Lomé, the capital of Togo.

History
The Université des Sciences et Technologies du Togo is a university institution for scientific, cultural and professional character, enjoying corporate personality, pedagogical and scientific, administrative and financial autonomy.
It contributes to the missions of higher education and scientific research through five Faculties and one University Institute for Technology.

The UST-TG is a member institution of the Network of Universities of Science and Technology of the Countries of Africa south of the Sahara.

Organization
The UST-TG has five faculties, one university institute for technology and one research center:

Faculties
 Faculty of Legal, Administrative and Political
 Faculty of Economics
 Faculty of Management Sciences
 Faculty of Fundamental and Applied Sciences
 Faculty of Letters, Arts and Social Sciences

Institute
 University Institute for Technology

Research centre
 Consortium for the Management of Basic and Applied Research in Africa south of the Sahara

References

Universities and colleges in Togo
Lomé
Educational institutions established in 2012
2012 establishments in Togo